The Edmonton Navy Cardinals were a baseball team located in Edmonton, Alberta, Canada.  The team played for one season in 1946 as part of a three-team league in Edmonton.  The league's other teams were the Edmonton Cubs and the Edmonton Eskimos (baseball).

References

Nav
Defunct minor league baseball teams
Defunct baseball teams in Canada
Baseball teams in Alberta